Nineveh, Nova Scotia may refer to the following Canadian communities:

 Nineveh, Lunenburg, Nova Scotia
 Nineveh, an unincorporated place in the Municipality of the County of Victoria